"Golden Child" is a song by American rapper Lil Durk. It was released through Only the Family, Alamo Records, and Sony Music on March 10, 2022, as the fourth and final single for his seventh studio album, 7220, one day before the album was released. Durk wrote the song with producers Cubeatz (duo members Tim and Kevin Gomringer), Hitmaka, YC and Real Red. Engineering was handled by Justin Gibson and recording was handled by Javaun Mundle.

Composition and lyrics
On "Golden Child", Durk takes a shot at American DJ and interviewer DJ Vlad with the lines: "I don't speak tongues, period / I don't fuck with Vlad". A few other rappers have previously had problems with Vlad as federal officers have used what they said in interviews with him to answer his questions as evidence against them. Throughout the song, he raps about his loyalty ane name-drops previous collaborator, American singer Bryson Tiller. Preezy Brown of Vibe wrote that the song "capture[s] Durk in his freewheeling element that fans have come to love him for".

Music video
The official music video for "Golden Child", directed by Jerry Productions, premiered alongside the song on March 10, 2022. The video sees Durk hanging out with artists signed to his record label, Only the Family, as they flex huge stacks of cash.

Charts

References

2022 songs
Lil Durk songs
Songs written by Lil Durk
Songs written by Tim Gomringer
Songs written by Kevin Gomringer
Songs written by Hitmaka
Song recordings produced by Cubeatz
Sony Music singles